SS Samfairy was a Liberty ship built in the United States during World War II. She was transferred to the British Ministry of War Transportation (MoWT) upon completion.

Construction
Samfairy was laid down on 31 January 1944, under a Maritime Commission (MARCOM) contract, MC hull 2350, by J.A. Jones Construction, Brunswick, Georgia; she was sponsored by Mrs. Fran O. Sherrill, and launched on 16 March 1944.

History
She was allocated to Haldin & Philips, on 28 March 1944. On 24 April 1947, she was sold to S.G. Embiricos, Ltd., and renamed Admiral Cunningham. She was scrapped in 1969.

References

Bibliography

 
 
 
 
 
 

 

Liberty ships
Ships built in Brunswick, Georgia
1944 ships
Liberty ships transferred to the British Ministry of War Transport